Parepisparis virgatus, the brown twisted moth, is a moth of the family Geometridae. The species was first described by Malcolm J. Scoble and Edward David Edwards in 1990. It is found in the Australian states of New South Wales and Victoria.

References

Moths of Australia
Oenochrominae
Moths described in 1990